Juan Camous (1929 – 2003) was a Venezuelan fencer. He competed in the individual and team épée events at the 1952 Summer Olympics.

References

External links
 

1929 births
2003 deaths
Venezuelan male épée fencers
Olympic fencers of Venezuela
Fencers at the 1952 Summer Olympics
Pan American Games bronze medalists for Venezuela
Pan American Games medalists in fencing
Fencers at the 1955 Pan American Games
20th-century Venezuelan people